MedMal Direct Insurance Company (MedMal Direct) is a direct-write medical malpractice insurance company headquartered in Jacksonville, Florida. MedMal Direct Insurance does not use independent brokers, but rather sells insurance coverage direct to the physicians through sales representatives, website, and direct marketing.  The company provides medical professional liability insurance, regulatory compliance protection, and cyber-liability coverage directly to healthcare providers and healthcare facilities.

The company enables physician practices in Florida, Georgia, Illinois, Missouri, North Carolina, Ohio, Oklahoma, Pennsylvania, and Texas to realize significant savings on one of their largest expenses – medical professional liability insurance premiums. MedMal Direct has over $54 Million in Admitted Assets and $17.7 Million in Surplus as of December 31, 2020. In 10 years, the company has grown its book of business to $21.2 Million in Direct Written Premium as of December 31, 2020, up from $20.1 Million in the year prior. With a Financial Stability Rating® of A, Exceptional from Demotech, Inc, MedMal Direct has the financial security to serve its policyholder while also backed by a panel of reinsurer partners with combined assets exceeding $280 billion, all of whom financial strength ratings of “A+” (Superior) or “A” (Excellent) from A.M. Best. These reinsurance relationships do not in any way guarantee the solvency of the company. However, as a licensed and admitted insurance company in Florida, the company is a member of the Florida Insurance Guaranty Association, which covers all Property and casualty insurers with a certificate of authority issued by the Florida Office of Insurance Regulation (OIR).

Management Team 
 P. Butler Ball, Founder & Board Member
 Melodee S. Dixon, President & Chief Executive Officer
 Marc D. Hammett, Chief Financial Officer
 T. Bryan Carter, Senior Vice President, Sales & Marketing

External links 
 

Laura Street
Insurance companies based in Florida
Financial services companies based in Jacksonville, Florida
Liberty Mutual